The ouija, also known as a spirit board or talking board, is a flat board marked with the letters of the Latin alphabet, the numbers 0–9, the words "yes", "no", occasionally "hello" and "goodbye", along with various symbols and graphics. It uses a planchette (small heart-shaped piece of wood or plastic) as a movable indicator to spell out messages during a séance. Participants place their fingers on the planchette, and it is moved about the board to spell out words. "Ouija" is a trademark of Hasbro (inherited from Parker Brothers), but is often used generically to refer to any talking board.

Spiritualists in the United States believed that the dead were able to contact the living and reportedly used a talking board very similar to a modern Ouija board at their camps in the U.S. state of Ohio in 1886 to ostensibly enable faster communication with spirits. Following its commercial introduction by businessman Elijah Bond on 1 July 1890, the Ouija board was regarded as an innocent parlor game unrelated to the occult until American spiritualist Pearl Curran popularized its use as a divining tool during World War I.

Paranormal and supernatural beliefs associated with Ouija have been criticized by the scientific community and are characterized as pseudoscience. The action of the board can be most easily explained by unconscious movements of those controlling the pointer, a psychophysiological phenomenon known as the ideomotor effect.

Mainstream Christian denominations, including Catholicism, have warned against the use of Ouija boards, considering their use Satanic practice, while other religious groups hold that they can lead to demonic possession. Occultists, on the other hand, are divided on the issue, with some claiming it can be a tool for positive transformation, while others reiterate the warnings of many Christians and caution "inexperienced users" against it.

Etymology
The popular belief that the word Ouija comes from the French and German words for yes is a misconception. The name is taken from a word spelled out on the board when its inventor asked a supposed ghost to name it.

History

Precursors

One of the first mentions of the automatic writing method used in the ouija board is found in China around 1100 AD, in historical documents of the Song dynasty. The method was known as fuji "planchette writing". The use of planchette writing as an ostensible means of necromancy and communion with the spirit-world continued, and, albeit under special rituals and supervisions, was a central practice of the Quanzhen School, until it was forbidden by the Qing dynasty.

Talking boards
As a part of the spiritualist movement, mediums began to employ various means for communication with the dead. Following the American Civil War in the United States, mediums did significant business in allegedly allowing survivors to contact lost relatives. The ouija itself was created and named in Baltimore, Maryland, in 1890, but the use of talking boards was so common by 1886 that news reported the phenomenon taking over the spiritualists' camps in Ohio.

Commercial parlor game
An employee of Elijah Bond, William Fuld, took over the talking board production. In 1901, Fuld started production of his own boards under the name "Ouija". Charles Kennard, the founder of Kennard Novelty Company which manufactured Fuld's talking boards and where Fuld had worked as a varnisher, claimed he learned the name "Ouija" from using the board and that it was an Ancient Egyptian word meaning "good luck". When Fuld took over production of the boards, he popularized the more widely accepted etymology: that the name came from a combination of the French and German words for "yes".

Scientific investigation

The ouija phenomenon is considered by the scientific community to be the result of the ideomotor response. Michael Faraday first described this effect in 1853, while investigating table-turning.

Various studies have been conducted, recreating the effects of the ouija board in the lab and showing that, under laboratory conditions, the subjects were moving the planchette involuntarily. A 2012 study found that when answering yes or no questions, ouija use was significantly more accurate than guesswork, suggesting that it might draw on the unconscious mind. Skeptics have described ouija board users as 'operators'. Some critics have noted that the messages ostensibly spelled out by spirits were similar to whatever was going through the minds of the subjects. According to professor of neurology Terence Hines in his book Pseudoscience and the Paranormal (2003):

The planchette is guided by unconscious muscular exertions like those responsible for table movement. Nonetheless, in both cases, the illusion that the object (table or planchette) is moving under its own control is often extremely powerful and sufficient to convince many people that spirits are truly at work ... The unconscious muscle movements responsible for the moving tables and Ouija board phenomena seen at seances are examples of a class of phenomena due to what psychologists call a dissociative state. A dissociative state is one in which consciousness is somehow divided or cut off from some aspects of the individual's normal cognitive, motor, or sensory functions.

Some involuntary movements are known as “Automatism”.

This correlates with the ideomotor phenomenon because both rely on unconscious movement. The difference is that the ideomotor phenomenon is based on the idea that just the idea that something can happen tricks the brain into doing it. For example, thinking about not moving the planchette leads to the possibility of the planchette moving, which then makes someone unconsciously move the planchette.

Ouija boards were already criticized by scholars early on, being described in a 1927 journal as vestigial remains' of primitive belief-systems" and a con to part fools from their money. Another 1921 journal described reports of ouija board findings as 'half truths' and suggested that their inclusion in national newspapers at the time lowered the national discourse overall.

In the 1970s ouija board users were also described as "cult members" by sociologists, though this was severely scrutinised in the field.

Religious responses

Since early in the Ouija board's history, it has been criticized by several Christian denominations. The Catholic Church in the Catechism of the Catholic Church in paragraph 2116 explicitly forbids any practice of divination which includes the usage of Ouija boards. Also, Catholic Answers, a Roman Catholic Christian apologetics organization, states that "The Ouija board is far from harmless, as it is a form of divination (seeking information from supernatural sources)." Moreover, Catholic bishops in Micronesia called for the boards to be banned and warned congregations that they were talking to demons when using Ouija boards. In a pastoral letter, The Dutch Reformed Churches encouraged its communicants to avoid Ouija boards, as it is a practice "related to the occult". The Wisconsin Evangelical Lutheran Synod also forbids its faithful from using Ouija boards as it teaches that such would be a violation of the Ten Commandments.

In 2001, Ouija boards were burned in Alamogordo, New Mexico, by fundamentalist groups as "symbols of witchcraft". Religious criticism has also expressed beliefs that the Ouija board reveals information which should only be in God's hands, and thus it is a tool of Satan. A spokesperson for Human Life International described the boards as a portal to talk to spirits and called for Hasbro to be prohibited from marketing them.

These religious objections to use of the Ouija board have in turn given rise to ostension type folklore in the communities where they circulate.  Cautionary tales that the board opens a door to evil spirits turn the game into the subject of a supernatural dare, especially for young people.

Notable users

Literature

Ouija boards have been the source of inspiration for literary works, used as guidance in writing or as a form of channeling literary works. As a result of Ouija boards' becoming popular in the early 20th century, by the 1920s many "psychic" books were written of varying quality often initiated by ouija board use.

 Emily Grant Hutchings claimed that her novel Jap Herron: A Novel Written from the Ouija Board (1917) was dictated by Mark Twain's spirit through the use of a Ouija board after his death.
 Pearl Lenore Curran (1883–1937), alleged that for over 20 years she was in contact with a spirit named Patience Worth. This symbiotic relationship produced several novels, and works of poetry and prose, which Pearl Curran claimed were delivered to her through channelling Worth's spirit during sessions with a ouija board, and which works Curran then transcribed.
 Much of William Butler Yeats's later poetry was inspired, among other facets of occultism, by the Ouija board.
 In late 1963, Jane Roberts and her husband Robert Butts started experimenting with a ouija board as part of Roberts' research for a book on extra-sensory perception. According to Roberts and Butts, on 2 December 1963, they began to receive coherent messages from a male personality (an "energy personality essence no longer focused in the physical world") who eventually identified himself as "Seth", culminating in a series of books dictated by "Seth".
 In 1982, poet James Merrill released an apocalyptic 560-page epic poem titled The Changing Light at Sandover, which documented two decades of messages dictated from the Ouija board during séances hosted by Merrill and his partner David Noyes Jackson. Sandover, which received the National Book Critics Circle Award in 1983, was published in three volumes beginning in 1976. The first contained a poem for each of the letters A through Z, and was called The Book of Ephraim. It appeared in the collection Divine Comedies, which won the Pulitzer Prize for Poetry in 1977. According to Merrill, the spirits ordered him to write and publish the next two installments, Mirabell: Books of Number in 1978 (which won the National Book Award for Poetry) and Scripts for the Pageant in 1980.

Aleister Crowley
Aleister Crowley had great admiration for the use of the ouija board and it played a passing role in his magical workings. Jane Wolfe, who lived with Crowley at Abbey of Thelema, also used the Ouija board. She credits some of her greatest spiritual communications to use of this implement. Crowley also discussed the Ouija board with another of his students, and the most ardent of them, Frater Achad (Charles Stansfeld Jones): it is frequently mentioned in their unpublished letters. In 1917 Achad experimented with the board as a means of summoning Angels, as opposed to Elementals. In one letter Crowley told Jones:

Your Ouija board experiment is rather fun. You see how very satisfactory it is, but I believe things improve greatly with practice. I think you should keep to one angel, and make the magical preparations more elaborate.

Over the years, both became so fascinated by the board that they discussed marketing their own design. Their discourse culminated in a letter, dated 21 February 1919, in which Crowley tells Jones,

Re: Ouija Board. I offer you the basis of ten percent of my net profit. You are, if you accept this, responsible for the legal protection of the ideas, and the marketing of the copyright designs. I trust that this may be satisfactory to you. I hope to let you have the material in the course of a week.

In March, Crowley wrote to Achad to inform him, "I'll think up another name for Ouija." But their business venture never came to fruition and Crowley's new design, along with his name for the board, has not survived. Crowley has stated, of the Ouija Board that,

There is, however, a good way of using this instrument to get what you want, and that is to perform the whole operation in a consecrated circle, so that undesirable aliens cannot interfere with it. You should then employ the proper magical invocation in order to get into your circle just the one spirit you want. It is comparatively easy to do this. A few simple instructions are all that is necessary, and I shall be pleased to give these, free of charge, to any one who cares to apply.

Others

 Roland Doe used a Ouija board, which the Catholic Church stated led to his possession by a demon.
 Dick Brooks, of the Houdini Museum in Scranton, Pennsylvania, uses a Ouija board as part of a paranormal and seance presentation.
 G. K. Chesterton used a Ouija board in his teenage years.
 Around 1893, he had gone through a crisis of scepticism and depression, and during this period Chesterton experimented with the Ouija board and grew fascinated with the occult.
 Bill Wilson, the co-founder of Alcoholics Anonymous, used a Ouija board and conducted seances in attempts to contact the dead.
 Early press releases stated that Vincent Furnier's stage and band name "Alice Cooper" was agreed upon after a session with a Ouija board, during which it was revealed that Furnier was the reincarnation of a 17th-century witch with that name. Alice Cooper later revealed that he just thought of the first name that came to his head while discussing a new band name with his band.
 Former Italian Prime Minister Romano Prodi claimed under oath that, in a séance held in 1978 with other professors at the University of Bologna, the "ghost" of Giorgio La Pira used a Ouija to spell the name of the street where Aldo Moro was being held by the Red Brigades.
 According to Peter Popham of The Independent: "Everybody here has long believed that Prodi's Ouija board tale was no more than an ill-advised and bizarre way to conceal the identity of his true source, probably a person from Bologna's seething far-left underground whom he was pledged to protect."
 The Mars Volta wrote their album Bedlam in Goliath (2008) based on their alleged experiences with a Ouija board.
 According to their story (written for them by a fiction author, Jeremy Robert Johnson), Omar Rodriguez Lopez purchased one while traveling in Jerusalem. At first the board provided a story which became the theme for the album. Strange events allegedly related to this activity occurred during the recording of the album: the studio flooded, one of the album's main engineers had a nervous breakdown, equipment began to malfunction, and Cedric Bixler-Zavala's foot was injured. Following these bad experiences the band buried the Ouija board.
 In the murder trial of Joshua Tucker, his mother insisted that he had carried out the murders while possessed by the Devil, who found him when he was using a Ouija board.
 In London in 1994, convicted murderer Stephen Young was granted a retrial after it was learned that four of the jurors had conducted a Ouija board séance and had "contacted" the murdered man, who had named Young as his killer. Young was convicted for a second time at his retrial and jailed for life.
 E. H. Jones and C. W. Hill, whilst prisoners of the Turks during the First World War, used a Ouija board to convince their captors that they were mediums as part of an escape plan.

In popular culture 

Ouija boards have figured prominently in horror tales in various media as devices enabling malevolent spirits to spook their users.  Most often, they make brief appearances, relying heavily on the atmosphere of mystery the board already holds in the mind of the viewer, in order to add credence to the paranormal presence in the story being told.

In the 1960 supernatural horror film 13 Ghosts the family Zorba plays the game "Ouija, the mystifying oracle."

Malayalam movie Romancham is based on real incidents that happened in the life of seven bachelors in 2007 Bangalore after using a Ouija board and subsequent events, the film satirically explores how divination that started as fun becomes a problem bigger than boredom.

Episodes of Lost in Space ("Ghost in Space" (1966)) and The Waltons ("The Ghost Story" (1974)) have spirit boards as part of their plots.

A Ouija board is an early part of the plot of the 1973 horror film The Exorcist.  Using a Ouija board the young girl Regan makes what first appears to be harmless contact with an entity named "Captain Howdy". She later becomes possessed by a demon.

Based on Ouija Board, a song and album of the name, Ojah Awake, by Osibisa, was released in 1976.

The 1986 film Witchboard and its sequels center on the use of Ouija. The 1991 film And You Thought Your Parents Were Weird features use of a Ouija board in an important early scene. What Lies Beneath (2000) includes a séance scene with a board. Paranormal Activity (2007) involves a violent entity haunting a couple that becomes more powerful when the Ouija board is used. Another 2007 film, Ouija, depicted a group of adolescents whose use of the board causes a murderous spirit to follow them, while four years later, The Ouija Experiment portrayed a group of friends whose use of the board opens, and fails to close, a portal between the worlds of the living and the dead. The 2012 film I Am Zozo follows a group of people that run afoul of a demon (based on Pazuzu) after using a Ouija board. The 2014 film Ouija features a group of friends whose use of the board prompts a series of deaths. That film was followed by a 2016 prequel, Ouija: Origin of Evil, which also features the device.

The British singer Morrissey released a controversial single titled "Ouija Board, Ouija Board" in 1989. The lyrics and the video of the song mockingly play with the idea of supernaturally contacting dead persons.

Jeremy Gans' nonfiction book, The Ouija Board Jurors: Mystery, Mischief and Misery in the Jury System, based on an article he wrote for the University of Melbourne, recounts an incident in which four jurors sought the help of a Ouija board during a double murder trial, both for guidance and to relieve the stress precipitated by the brutal images of evidence.

The National Geographic show Brain Games Season 5 episode "Paranormal" clearly showed the board did not work when all participants were blindfolded.

The sitcom Steptoe and Son in Series 8 Episode 6, includes a scene with a Ouija board where Harold briefly fools Albert into believing that they are in contact with the ghost of Adolf Hitler.

See also
 Alien hand syndrome
 Automatic writing
 Bicameral mentality
 Charlie Charlie challenge
 Divided consciousness
 Dowsing
 Dual consciousness
 Fuji (planchette writing)
 Gope boards
 Kokkuri
 Left brain interpreter
 List of topics characterized as pseudoscience
 Bunshinsaba
 Omikuji
 Tengenjutsu (fortune telling)

Notes

References
 Cain, D. Lynn, "OUIJA – For the Record" 2009 
 Carpenter, W.B., "On the Influence of Suggestion in Modifying and directing Muscular Movement, independently of Volition", Royal Institution of Great Britain, (Proceedings), 1852, (12 March 1852), pp. 147–153.
 Cornelius, J. Edward, Aleister Crowley and the Ouija Board. Feral House, 2005. 
 Gruss, Edmond C., The Ouija Board: A Doorway to the Occult 1994 
 Hunt, Stoker, Ouija: The Most Dangerous Game. 1992 
 Hill, Joe, Heart-Shaped Box
 Murch, R., "A Brief History of the Ouija Board", Fortean Times, No.249, (June 2009), pp. 32–33.
 Schneck, R.D., "Ouija Madness", Fortean Times, No.249, (June 2009), pp. 30–37.
 Gans, P. J., & University of Melbourne. (2022, May 11). Trial by ouija board: When jurors misbehave. In Pursuit.

External links
it.unimelb.edu.au/articles/trial-by-ouija-board-when-jurors-misbehave

Information on talking boards
 Museum Of Talking Boards
 The Official Website of William Fuld and home of the Ouija board

Skeptics
 The Skeptics' Dictionary: Ouija
 An Encyclopedia of Claims, Frauds, and Hoaxes of the Occult and Supernatural
 How does a Ouija board work? from The Straight Dope
 Do Ouija Boards Work - The Fact and Fiction

Other
 "'Ouija board' appeal (against second guilty verdict) dismissed" – R. v. Young (1995)
 BBC video on Ouija Board
 

Spiritism
Divination software and games
Parker Brothers games
Magic tricks